Adrian Victorovich Prakhov (16 March 1846, Mstislavl, Russian Empire - 14 May 1916, Yalta, Russian Empire) was a Russian art critic, archaeologist and art historian.

Biography 
In 1863, he entered Saint Petersburg University, where he studied history and philology.  After graduating in 1867, he was sent abroad for further studies, in preparation for employment with the Department of Art History.

In Munich, he attended the lectures of several scientists, including Heinrich Brunn, and studied the examples of Ancient Greek art in the collection of the Glyptothek. This was followed by similar studies in Paris, London, Berlin, Vienna and Italy, where he became a member of the German Archaeological Institute of Rome. Upon returning in 1873, he was awarded a master's degree for his thesis, "On the restoration of the eastern group of pediments at the temple to Aegina in Athens". Shortly after, he was chosen to be a lecturer.

From 1875 to 1878, he edited an illustrated magazine called  (The Bee) and, from the same year to 1887, he taught the history and theory of fine art at the Imperial Academy of Arts. He received his doctoral degree in 1879 for his dissertation, "The Architecture of Ancient Egypt".
After that, he turned to Ancient Russian art of the early Christian period, researching and sketching the mosaics and murals at Saint Sophia's Cathedral and St. Cyril's Monastery in Kyiv. From 1881 to 1882 he traveled throughout Greece, Turkey, and the Middle East. In 1886, he studied the Assumption Cathedral and several other structures in Volodymyr-Volynskyi.

The following year, he copied the unique frescoes at St. Michael's Monastery. The originals were lost in 1934, when the Soviet government demolished the monastery. That same year (1887), Prakhov moved from the University of Saint Petersburg to the University of Kyiv, where he taught until 1897.

While there, he was in charge of managing interior decoration for St Volodymyr's Cathedral, including marble and bronze works, frescoes and furniture. He made two trips to Greece to study Byzantine decorative styles and oversaw a large group of well-known Russian  and Ukrainian painters, including Victor Vasnetsov and Mikhail Nesterov. In 1897, he returned to his former chair in Saint Petersburg and remained there until his death. After 1901, he and Alexandre Benois edited Художественные сокровища России (Russian Art Treasures), the monthly journal of the Imperial Society for the Encouragement of the Arts.

His wife, was a concert pianist who had studied with Franz Liszt and also posed as a model for the painter, Mikhail Vrubel. His son, was a painter and art historian. His daughter, was an amateur artist, and worked as a model for Mikhail Nesterov, to whom she was briefly engaged.

Writings available online 
 Критические наблюдения над формами изящных искусств. Зодчество древнего Египта. (Critical observation of forms of Fine Arts. Architecture of Ancient Egypt) 1880.
 Киевское искусство X, XI и XII вв. Каталог выставки копий с памятников искусства в Киеве X, XI и XII вв. (Kyiv Art X, XI and XII centuries. Catalog of the exhibition of copies of works of art in Kyiv, X, XI and XII centuries) 1883.
 Открытие фресок Киево-Кирилловской церкви XII века, исполненное в 1881 и 1882 г.г. (The discovery of murals in St. Cyril's Church of Kyiv-the XII century, executed in 1881 and 1882) 1883.
 Альбом Исторической выставки предметов искусства, устроенной в 1904 году в С.-Петербурге. (Historical Album of art exhibitions, set up in 1904 in St. Petersburg) 1907.

References

External links 

 A description of the work at St Volodymyr's Cathedral by Prakhov's son, Nikolai @ the Victor Vasnetsov website.

1846 births
1916 deaths
Russian art critics
Russian art historians
Russian archaeologists
People from Mstsislaw
Saint Petersburg State University alumni
Academic staff of the Taras Shevchenko National University of Kyiv